The 2001 Duke Blue Devils football team represented the Duke University in the 2001 NCAA Division I-A football season. The team participated as members of the Atlantic Coast Conference. They played their homes games at Wallace Wade Stadium in Durham, North Carolina. The team was led by head coach Carl Franks.

This season was notable for being one of the only time a team has gone winless in two straight seasons, with Duke also going winless in 2000.

Schedule

References

Duke
Duke Blue Devils football seasons
College football winless seasons
Duke Blue Devils football